Bilal Said Al-Azma (born 23 February 1955) is a Saudi Arabian sprinter. He competed in the men's 4 × 100 metres relay at the 1972 Summer Olympics.

References

External links
 

1955 births
Living people
Athletes (track and field) at the 1972 Summer Olympics
Saudi Arabian male sprinters
Saudi Arabian male long jumpers
Olympic athletes of Saudi Arabia
Place of birth missing (living people)